Tipula paludosa is a species of true craneflies, family Tipulidae. It is also known as the European crane fly or the marsh crane fly. It is a pest in grasslands of Northwest Europe and has been accidentally introduced to North America.

Distribution
Tipula paludosa is widespread throughout the West Palaearctic and Nearctic.  For identification see the Keys to the Insects of the European Part of the USSR and the Diptères: Tipulidae. Tipula paludosa is a very common species flying in May and July to October peaking in August and September.

Biological interactions
Tipula paludosa larvae live in the upper soil layers and are the major insect pest in grasslands of Northwest Europe.

Oscheius tipulae is a species of nematodes, described in association of the leatherjacket, the larva of T. paludosa.

References

Tipulidae
Diptera of Europe
Diptera of North America
Agricultural pest insects
Insects described in 1830
Taxa named by Johann Wilhelm Meigen